John George Chetwynd-Talbot, 21st Earl of Shrewsbury, 21st Earl of Waterford, 6th Earl Talbot (21 January 1914 – 12 November 1980), styled Viscount of Ingestre from 1915 to 1921, was a British peer.

Life
He was the son of Charles John Alton Chetwynd-Talbot, Viscount of Ingestre (1882–1915), and Lady Winifred Constance Hester Paget, sister of the Marquess of Anglesey. He inherited the title Earl of Shrewsbury when his grandfather Charles Chetwynd-Talbot, 20th Earl of Shrewsbury, died in 1921. 

He married his first wife, Nadine Muriel Crofton (1913–2003), in 1936. He sued for divorce in 1958, but in 1959 judge Charles A. Collingwood rejected the divorce suit. In a subsequent proceeding, a divorce was granted.

Shrewsbury was the Honorary Air Commodore of No. 3509 (Staffordshire) Fighter Control Unit before it was disbanded on 11 May 1957.

Lord Shrewsbury's second wife was Nina Mortlock. His son Charles succeeded to Lord Shrewsbury's titles on his death.

References

1914 births
1980 deaths
John Talbot
Earls of Shrewsbury
Earls of Waterford
Barons Talbot
20th-century English nobility
Earls Talbot